Khleif Ayyat (born December 1, 1929) is a Jordanian olympic sports shooter. He represented Jordan at the 1980 Summer Olympics in Moscow.

Olympic participation

Moscow 1980
Khleif  was the oldest participant for Jordan in that tournament aged 50 years and 235 days by the start of the tournament. He competed in both mixed 50 metre rifle prone and mixed 50 metre rifle three positions events.

Mixed 50 metre rifle prone

he finished 32nd out of 56 competitor.

Mixed 50 metre rifle three positions

he finished 32nd out of 39 competitor.

References

External links
 
 

1929 births
Living people
People from Mafraq
20th-century Jordanian people